Outville is an unincorporated community in Licking County, in the U.S. state of Ohio.

History
Outville had its start when the railroad was extended to that point. A post office was established at Outville in 1858, and remained in operation until 1960.

References

Unincorporated communities in Licking County, Ohio
1858 establishments in Ohio
Populated places established in 1858
Unincorporated communities in Ohio